Modelio is an open-source UML tool developed by Modeliosoft, based in Paris, France. It supports the UML2 and BPMN standards.

Licensing
The core Modelio software was released under the GPLv3 on October 5, 2011. Key APIs are licensed under the more permissive Apache License 2.0.

Features
Modelio supports UML2 Profiles for XSD, WSDL and BPEL, SoaML for service modelling in distributed environments; and BPMN for  business process modelling.

Interoperability
Modelio was one of six tools participating in the Interoperability Demonstration held by the OMG's Model Interchange Working Group (MIWG) on December 7, 2009. The event demonstrated XMI interoperability between the participating tools.

The MADES Project intends to use Modelio to develop new modelling annotations with relevance to avionic and surveillance applications.

Community modules
Add-on modules are available through the Modelio community Website. These add support for TOGAF business process modeling; SysML system architecture modeling (although with reduced functionality in the open source version, the requirement diagram type is not available); MARTE for specifying embedded systems, and Java code generation, reverse and roundtrip engineering.

References

External links
Modelio Website
Modeliosoft Website
 

UML tools
Free software
Free UML tools
Free software programmed in Java (programming language)
Cross-platform software
Java platform software